Heimdall is one of the largest known impact craters on Jupiter's Galilean satellite Callisto, with a diameter of 210 km. It was firstly suspected on Voyager images, and later confirmed by Galileo.

Cratered plains form the oldest recognizable unit on Callisto, but subtle differences in color and crater frequencies suggest regional differences in its development. The formation of Adlinda, Asgard, Valhalla, Heimdall, and Lofn crater appear to follow in that order.

Heimdall was named after the god of light in Norse mythology; this name was approved by the International Astronomical Union in 2000.

See also 

 List of geological features on Callisto
 List of craters on Callisto
 Valhalla

References 

Callisto (moon)
Impact craters on Jupiter's moons